Arrested decay is a term coined by the U.S. State of California, to explain how it would preserve its Bodie State Historic Park. A more common application of this concept is the preservation of war ruins as memorials.

United States 
At Bodie State Historic Park, the structures will be maintained, but only to the extent that they will not be allowed to fall over or otherwise deteriorate in a major way.

Any building that was standing in 1962, when Bodie became a State Park, may be rebuilt or preserved as the photographs of 1962 showed them. By putting new roofs on the buildings, rebuilding foundations, and resealing glass that is in window frames, the State is able to keep buildings from naturally decaying.

Eastern State Penitentiary in Philadelphia, Pennsylvania, uses a similar system, though it uses the term "preserved ruin."

Croatia 
The authorities in Vukovar, Croatia decided to keep the old water tower in the city as it is found today and as it had become after the war — gnarled by artillery.

Berlin, Germany 
Several buildings destroyed in the Second World War have been preserved in their ruined condition as memorials. These include part of the facade of the Anhalter Bahnhof and the belfry of the Kaiser Wilhelm Memorial Church.

Sarajevo, Bosnia 
The authorities in Sarajevo, Bosnia have also preserved the building of the daily newspaper Oslobođenje to this day the way it was shelled during the Bosnian War.

Hiroshima, Japan 
In 1996, the Hiroshima Peace Memorial was acknowledged as a Unesco World Heritage Site. Originally completed in 1905, the building was known at the time of the Hiroshima atomic bomb explosion on August 6, 1945, as the Hiroshima Prefectural Industrial Promotion Hall. Although suffering considerable damage, it was the closest structure to the hypocenter of the explosion to withstand the blast without being leveled to the ground. It has been preserved in the condition it was in after the bombing to serve as a symbol of hope for world peace and nuclear disarmament.

Oradour-sur-Glane, France 
Oradour-sur-Glane was a village in the Limousin région of France that was destroyed on 10 June 1944, when 642 of its inhabitants – men, women and children – were murdered by a German Waffen-SS company. Although a new village was built after World War II, away from the ruins of the former village, the old village – the site of the massacre – still stands as a memorial to the dead and as being representative of similar sites and events. Part of the memorial includes items recovered from the burned-out buildings: watches stopped at the time their owners were burned alive; glasses – melted from the intense heat; and various personal items and money.

References

Building
Historic preservation